ISME may refer to:
 International Society for Microbial Ecology
 Iranian Society of Mechanical Engineers
 International Society for Music Education
 Irish Small and Medium Enterprise Association
 International School of Management Excellence

isme may refer to:
 a catalogue and mail order brand in the Shop Direct Group